Dietzia aurantiaca is a Gram-positive, aerobic, coccoid and non-spore-forming bacterium from the genus Dietzia which has been isolated from the cerebrospinal fluid from a patient from Göteborg in Sweden.

References

External links
Type strain of Dietzia aurantiaca at BacDive -  the Bacterial Diversity Metadatabase	

Mycobacteriales
Bacteria described in 2012